Małaszewicze  is a village in the administrative district of Gmina Terespol, within Biała Podlaska County, Lublin Voivodeship, in eastern Poland, close to the border with Belarus. The village has a population of 4,000.

Małaszewicze hosts one of the largest dry cargo port stations in Europe. This is accomplished through transshipment of containers from rolling stock of broad-gauge (1520 mm) onto standard gauge (1435 mm) wagons, and vice versa.

References

Villages in Biała Podlaska County